Panyukino is a rural locality (a village) in Malyginskoye Rural Settlement, Kovrovsky District, Vladimir Oblast, Russia. The population was 7 as of 2010.

Geography 
Panyukino is located 19 km north of Kovrov (the district's administrative centre) by road. Polevaya is the nearest rural locality.

References 

Rural localities in Kovrovsky District